The LSU Tigers college football team represents Louisiana State University (LSU) in the West Division of the Southeastern Conference (SEC). The Tigers compete as part of the NCAA Division I Football Bowl Subdivision. The program has had 32 head coaches since it began play during the 1893 season. Since November 2021, Brian Kelly has served as LSU's head coach.

The team has played more than 1,200 games over 124 seasons of LSU football. Twelve coaches have led the Tigers in postseason bowl games: Bernie Moore, Gus Tinsley, Paul Dietzel, Charlie McClendon, Jerry Stovall, Bill Arnsparger, Mike Archer, Gerry DiNardo, Nick Saban, Les Miles,Ed Orgeron, and Brian Kelly.  In addition, an Edgar Wingard-coached team accepted an invitation to participate in the first Bacardi Bowl. Six of those coaches also won conference championships after LSU left the Southern Conference to join the SEC: Moore, Dietzel, McClendon, Arnsparger, Archer, Saban, Miles, and Orgeron won a combined twelve as a member of the SEC. During their tenures, Dietzel, Saban, Miles, and Orgeron each won national championships awarded by major selectors while with the Tigers.

McClendon is the leader in seasons coached and games won, with 137 victories during his 18 years with the program. Allen Jeardeau has the highest winning percentage of those who have coached more than one game, with .875. John P. Gregg and John W. Mayhew have the lowest winning percentage of those who have coached more than one game, with .333. Bo Rein was hired in 1979 as head coach, but died in a plane crash on January 10, 1980, without ever coaching a game at LSU. Of the 32 different head coaches who have led the Tigers, Dana X. Bible, Mike Donahue, Biff Jones, Moore, and Charlie McClendon have been inducted into the College Football Hall of Fame.

Key

Coaches

Notes

References 
General

 
 

Specific

Lists of college football head coaches
LSU Tigers football coaches